George Woods may refer to:

Government and politics
 George Austin Woods (1828–1905), British navy officer who served as premier of the Kingdom of Viti, 1872–1874
 George Lemuel Woods (1832–1890), American Oregon State and Utah Territory governor
 George Woods (British politician) (1886–1951), British Labour Co-operative politician, MP for Finsbury 1935–1945
 George E. Woods (1923–2007), American federal judge

Sports
 George Woods (footballer) (1884–1962), Australian footballer
 George Woods (shot putter) (1943–2022), American track and field athlete

Other
 George Woods (artist) (1898–1963), New Zealand artist
 George David Woods (1901–1982), American banker and World Bank president
 George Woods (Pitt Chancellor), Chancellor of the University of Pittsburgh

See also
George Wood (disambiguation)